Gymnothorax serratidens is a moray eel found in the southeast Pacific Ocean around Peru. It was first named by Hildebrand and Barton in 1949.

References

serratidens
Fish described in 1954